Nicole Kantek (born 6 July 1981) is an Australian gymnast. She competed in six events at the 1996 Summer Olympics.

References

1981 births
Living people
Australian female artistic gymnasts
Olympic gymnasts of Australia
Gymnasts at the 1996 Summer Olympics
Sportspeople from Sydney
20th-century Australian women